Elena Viktorovna Baranova (born 28 January 1972) is a Russian former professional basketball player.  She is a former Women's National Basketball Association (WNBA) player, where she became the first player from Europe in 1997 WNBA inaugural season, the first All-Star from Russia in 2001 and played for the New York Liberty until the 2005 season.

Career
Baranova was born in the Kirghiz Soviet Socialist Republic. She started playing professional basketball at age 16, was included to the Soviet national team at the age of 17, won European Championship at the age of 19 in 1991, and became the Olympic champion at the age of 20 in 1992.

WNBA
Baranova was assigned to the Utah Starzz on 22 January 1997. She was later traded with Utah's second-round pick in the 2000 WNBA Draft to the Miami Sol in exchange for Kate Starbird and the 8th pick in the 2000 WNBA Draft (15 December 1999).  She was taken in the 2003 WNBA Dispersal draft by the New York Liberty.

In January 1997, Baranova was selected among world's 16 top players to play in the inaugural WNBA season and in the first and inaugural WNBA championship. So the league was created and she became the first player from Russia and even from Europe to play in the World's Top Women's Basketball League.

Also known as 'Russian Queen' and 'SuperNova', Elena shined in 7 WNBA seasons during 1997–2005: 3 for Utah Starzz, 1 for Miami Sol and 3 for New York Liberty. She took part in 220 games where she scored 2,215 points, leading her teams to the Conference Semifinals (2001, 2005) and Conference Final (2004) and proved her name and reputation as one of the best in Pro Basketball Women.

In her first WNBA season she led the League in blocked shots (2,25 blocks per game) and set the League's single-game record for three-point field goals with 7 of 9 recorded 22 July 1997 at Madison Square Garden, New York. In 2001 WNBA season she got 'The Bud Light Shooting Champion' trophy as the League's top free-throw shooter (with 93,1%). The same 2001 season she was selected to play in WNBA All-Star Game in Orlando to become the only player from Russia to represent her country at the All-Star Weekend, where she set WNBA All-Star Game record for blocked shots (4).

As one of the League's most versatile weapons, Elena is one of just 2 players in WNBA All-Time History to record over 200 three-point field goals (with 236) and 300 blocks (with 320). 
Although she performed just in 7 of WNBA's 12 seasons, Elena is still in the list of the League's best players of All-Time: 7th in blocks (320), 7th in blocks per game (1.53), 12th in 3-point field goal percentage (.391), 14th in rebounds per game (6.4), 17th in free-throw percentage (.845).

International 
Baranova's scoring and rebounding ability helped the Soviet national team to win gold medals at the 1991 European Championship and 1992 Olympics. She has played in 105 games for her National team (which is Russia all-time record for men and women), in which she scored over 1300 points representing her country at three Olympic Games (1992, 1996, 2004), two World championships (1998, 2002) and seven European Championships (1991, 1993, 1995, 1997, 1999, 2001, 2003). At last 3 events she appeared as the captain of Russian national team (2002 World championship, 2003 European championship, 2004 Olympic Games).

At 1998 World championship where Elena led Russia to silver medals she was awarded by MVP (Most Valuable Player) prize and in 2002 World championship (where she also brought Russians to become the vice-champions) Elena Baranova was selected to the World's Top 5 Team.

1991 European Champion as a member of USSR team (the last competition where USSR team took part), Elena led her country to the first Russian Gold medals in basketball at 2003 European Championship, where she also was selected to Europe 'Top 5 Team'.

Achievements
Europe: 22 seasons, over 650 games, over 12,000 points, over 6,000 rebounds 
Stroitel Frounze (USSR, 1988–1989), Dynamo Moscow (USSR, 1989–1992), Elitzur Holon (Israel, 1992–1994), CSKA Moscow (Russia, 1994–1999), Bison Mytischi (Russia, 1999), Fenerbahçe Istanbul (Turkey, 1999–2000), Villa Pini Chieti (Italy, 2000–2001), UMMC Ekaterinburg (Russia, 2001–2003), Dynamo Moscow (Russia, 2004–2005), Chevakata Vologda (Russia, 2006–2007), Ros Casares Valencia (Spain, 2007–2008), UMMC Ekaterinburg (Russia, 2008–2009), Nadezhda Orenburg (Russia, 2009–2011), Chevakata Vologda (Russia, 2011–2012).

WNBA: 7 seasons, 220 games (178 started), 2,215 points, 1,403 rebounds 
Utah Starzz (1997, 1998, 1999), Miami Sol (2001), New York Liberty (2003, 2004, 2005).

Other achievements
1997 Ronchetti Cup Champion (with CSKA Moscow). 
1998 European Player of The Year.
In 1999 Baranova played four men's basketball games for Bison Mytischi in the Moscow Oblast championships. She averaged 6.3 points, 6.25 rebounds and 2.75 blocks. By the end of the same 1999 year was selected as 'The Best Russian Basketball Player of 20th century' voted by the most popular Russian newspaper 'Sport-Express' readers.
2003 EuroLeague Women Champion (with UMMC Ekaterinburg) and Final Four MVP.
2010 FIBA Cup Finalist (with Nadezhda Orenburg).
6-times Champion of Russia (the only in Russian Women's Basketball) and Russian Cup winner, 2-times Champion of Israel and Israel Cup winner, Vice-Champion of Turkey and Turkish Cup winner, Champion of Spain and Spanish Cup and SuperCup winner.

Career statistics

WNBA

Source

Regular season

|-
| style="text-align:left;"| 1997
| style="text-align:left;"| Utah
| style="background:#D3D3D3"|28° || 27 || 32.6 || .390 || .377 || .694 || 7.4 || 2.2 || 1.5 || 2.3 || 2.9 || 12.2
|-
| style="text-align:left;"| 1998
| style="text-align:left;"| Utah
| 20 || 19 || 33.6 || .420 || .313 || .831 || 9.3 || 3.5 || 1.1 || 1.5 || 2.8 || 12.9
|-
| style="text-align:left;"| 1999
| style="text-align:left;"| Utah
| 29 || 19 || 19.7 || .405 || .417 || .805 || 3.4 || 1.6 || .7 || .8 || 1.5 || 6.0
|-
| style="text-align:left;"| 2001
| style="text-align:left;"| Miami
| style="background:#D3D3D3"|32° || 30 || 30.8 || .427 || .375 || style="background:#D3D3D3"|.930° || 6.0 || 2.0 || 1.0 || 1.8 || 1.9 || 11.8
|-
| style="text-align:left;"| 2003
| style="text-align:left;"| New York
| 33 || 7 || 25.8 || .416 || .363 || .886 || 5.5 || 1.9 || 1.1 || 1.3 || 1.9 || 8.4
|-
| style="text-align:left;"| 2004
| style="text-align:left;"| New York
| style="background:#D3D3D3"|34° || 33 || 30.8 || .463 || .461 || .925 || 7.2 || 2.0 || 1.1 || 1.7 || 2.4 || 11.6
|-
| style="text-align:left;"| 2005
| style="text-align:left;"| New York
| 33 || 33 || 28.9 || .441 || .388 || .855 || 6.9 || 1.8 || .8 || 1.4 || 1.8 || 8.7
|-
| style="text-align:left;"| Career
| style="text-align:left;"| 7 years, 3 teams
| 209 || 168 || 28.7 || .424 || .391 || .845 || 6.4 || 2.1 || 1.0 || 1.5 || 2.1 || 10.1

Playoffs

|-
| style="text-align:left;"| 2001
| style="text-align:left;"| Miami
| 3 || 3 || 35.0 || .455 || .545 || .727 || 6.0 || 2.3 || .7 || .7 || 3.0 || 14.7
|-
| style="text-align:left;"| 2004
| style="text-align:left;"| New York
| 5 || 5 || 30.8 || .395 || .308 || .800 || 6.8 || 2.0 || .8 || 1.8 || 2.4 || 8.4
|-
| style="text-align:left;"| 2005
| style="text-align:left;"| New York
| 2 || 2 || 29.5 || .300 || .333 || 1.000 || 4.0 || 1.0 || 1.5 || 1.0 || .5 || 4.5
|-
| style="text-align:left;"| Career
| style="text-align:left;"| 3 years, 2 teams
| 10 || 10 || 31.8 || .407 || .407 || .783 || 6.0 || 1.9 || .9 || 1.3 || 2.2 || 9.5
|-

References

External links

 Official website
 WNBA Player Profile
 Timeout with Elena Baranova
 Interbasket: Elena Baranova Bio

1972 births
Living people
Basketball players at the 1992 Summer Olympics
Basketball players at the 1996 Summer Olympics
Basketball players at the 2004 Summer Olympics
Russian expatriate basketball people in Israel
Fenerbahçe women's basketball players
Medalists at the 1992 Summer Olympics
Medalists at the 2004 Summer Olympics
Miami Sol players
New York Liberty players
Olympic basketball players of Russia
Olympic basketball players of the Unified Team
Olympic bronze medalists for Russia
Olympic gold medalists for the Unified Team
Olympic medalists in basketball
Power forwards (basketball)
Russian expatriate basketball people in Italy
Russian expatriate basketball people in Spain
Russian expatriate basketball people in Turkey
Russian expatriate basketball people in the United States
Russian women's basketball players
Kyrgyzstani women's basketball players
Soviet women's basketball players
Sportspeople from Bishkek
Utah Starzz players
Women's National Basketball Association All-Stars